River Police is a specialized unit of Bangladesh police responsible for policing internal river ways of Bangladesh. They are also responsible for policing fisherman and fishing in rivers. Additional Inspector General of Police Md. Shafiqul Islam is the head of the River Police.

History
River Police was established on 12 November 2013. It started out with 747 personnel under a Deputy Inspector General of Bangladesh Police. On 20 July 2010, the first camp of River Police was established in Dhaka at Mirpur. The government of Bangladesh had approved five River police camps within Dhaka city. In June 2019, River Police started operating in Rajshahi District.

References

2013 establishments in Bangladesh
Organisations based in Dhaka
Government agencies of Bangladesh
Law enforcement agencies of Bangladesh
Police units of Bangladesh